Sergey Kobyzev (born 3 June 1973) is a Russian short track speed skater. He competed in two events at the 1994 Winter Olympics.

References

1973 births
Living people
Russian male short track speed skaters
Olympic short track speed skaters of Russia
Short track speed skaters at the 1994 Winter Olympics
Sportspeople from Omsk